Aevolo is an American UCI Continental cycling team founded in 2017.

Team roster

Major results
2018
 National Time Trial Championships, Luis Villalobos
Stage 1 Colorado Classic, Gage Hecht
2021
Stage 2 Joe Martin Stage Race, Tyler Stites
Stage 3 (ITT) Joe Martin Stage Race, Gage Hecht

References

External links

UCI Continental Teams (America)
Cycling teams established in 2017
Cycling teams based in the United States
2017 establishments in the United States